Andrzej Jerzy Zglejszewski (born December 18, 1961) is a Polish-born prelate of the Roman Catholic Church.  He has been serving as an auxiliary bishop for the Diocese of Rockville Centre in New York since 2014.

Biography

Early life and education
Andrzej Zglejszewski was born in Czarna Bialostocka, Poland.  He was educated in Poland before completing his studies for the priesthood at the Seminary of the Immaculate Conception in Huntington, New York.

Ordination and ministry 
Zglejszewski was ordained a priest for the Diocese of Rockville Centre by Bishop John R. McGann on May 26, 1990.  Zglejszewski also undertook advanced studies in theology at the Catholic University of America in Washington, D.C., and Fordham University in New York City.

After his ordination, Zglejszewski served as the associate pastor at St. Christopher Parish in Baldwin, St. Thomas the Apostle Parish in West Hempstead, and St. Rose of Lima Parish in Massapequa, all in New York State.  Following his pastoral assignments, he served as the director of the Office of Worship for the diocese and as the co-chancellor for the diocese.  Zglejszewski also served as an adjunct professor at Immaculate Conception Seminary.

Auxiliary Bishop of Rockville Centre
Pope Francis named Zglejszewski the titular bishop of Nicives and an auxiliary bishop of the Diocese of Rockville Centre on February 11, 2014. He was consecrated in St. Agnes Cathedral in Rockville Centre on March 25, 2014, by Bishop William Murphy.  Bishop Robert E. Guglielmone and Auxiliary Bishop Robert J. Brennan were the principal co-consecrators.

See also

 Catholic Church hierarchy
 Catholic Church in the United States
 Historical list of the Catholic bishops of the United States
 List of Catholic bishops of the United States
 Lists of patriarchs, archbishops, and bishops

References

External links 
The Roman Catholic Diocese of Rockville Centre Official Site

Episcopal succession
 

}

1961 births
Living people
People from Białystok County
21st-century American Roman Catholic titular bishops
People from Rockville Centre, New York
People from Baldwin, Nassau County, New York
People from West Hempstead, New York
People from Huntington, New York
People from Massapequa, New York
Catholics from New York (state)
Bishops appointed by Pope Francis